Tinno Mobile is a Chinese ODM company focused on making phones for other brands. The company have also created their own mobile phone brands like , and Wiko Mobile. The company was established in 2005 and is headquartered at Shenzhen, Guangdong, China.

Tinno Mobile's customers include international operators such as Vodafone, Orange, and AT&T, etc, and phone brands including Motorola, Nokia, and Xiaomi. Tinno Mobile products are sold in more than 80 countries around the world. In 2020 Tinno shipped more than 28.7 million mobile phones and tablets worldwide.

The localized model of sub-branding have been praised by Wang Yang
in 2014 when he was Vice Premier of China at the time, saying they are a good example for "Ethnical (Chinese) Companies" to enter international market. The company said they have an annual revenue of 1 billion euro.

Scandals

Privacy data collection 
In 2016 December, it is revealed that pre-installed application developed by Adups within BLU phones would transmit user data to Chinese server without customer consent. Tinno is among the list of brands that were found to have Adups applications pre-installed on their phones.

In 2017 November, it is revealed that pre-installed application within Wiko phones, a Tinno subsidiary, would transmit technical data monthly to Tinno without customer consent. The company confirmed the existence of such information collection system, and said updated version of those applications will no longer collect geographical information of devices.

References

External links 

 Tinno Mobile Official site

Manufacturing companies based in Shenzhen
Chinese companies established in 2005
Telecommunication equipment companies of China
Electronics companies of China
Mobile phone manufacturers
Electronics companies established in 2005